Was nicht passt, wird passend gemacht is a German television series which is based on the 2002 movie with the same name.

See also
List of German television series

External links
 

Live action television shows based on films
2003 German television series debuts
2007 German television series endings
Television shows set in North Rhine-Westphalia
German-language television shows
ProSieben original programming